Lobitos Creek is a stream in San Mateo County, California.

Tributaries
Rogers Gulch
Schoolhouse Creek

References

See also
List of watercourses in the San Francisco Bay Area

Rivers of San Mateo County, California
Rivers of Northern California